The 1st Zvornik Brigade (Serbian: 1. 3ворничке бригаде; 1. Zvorničke Brigade) was a brigade of the Bosnian Serb army based in Zvornik. The brigade was known and, except for Marko Milošević, tried for its human rights atrocities against Bosnian Muslims during the 1992-1995 Bosnian War. Notable members of the Zvornik Brigade included Milošević, Dragan Obrenović, Milorad Trbić, and Brigadier Vinko Pandurević.

References

Bosnian War
History of Zvornik